Bloom (formerly MDP Worldwide, Behaviour Worldwide and Media 8 Entertainment) was an American independent film entertainment company engaged in financing, development, production and worldwide distribution of theatrical feature films in various forms of broadcast media.

Overview
The company was formed in 1993 by Mark Damon as MDP Worldwide (the "MDP" itself is short for Mark Damon Productions) and subsequently changed its name from MDP Worldwide to Behaviour Worldwide on March 27, 1998, before reverting to the MDP Worldwide name on May 31, 2000, before changing the name to Media 8 Entertainment on October 9, 2003.

In 1998, it was sold to Behaviour Communications, a Canadian production company from the assets of Malofilm for $19 million, which subsequently changed its name to Behaviour Worldwide. In 2000, citing the struggles of Behaviour themselves, Damon's investors opted to buy back the company, which was reverted to the MDP Worldwide moniker.

The company has offices in Los Angeles, California and Montreal, Quebec. The company, formerly known as Behavior Worldwide Entertainment, posted net income of C$5.5 million ($3.4 million) on revenues of $33.5 million for the year ended Sept. 30.

On May 15, 2004, it was announced that Media 8 Entertainment wanted to focus on film production following the success of the film Monster, and chose to focus on eight movies budgeted on the $10-$50 million range. On October 14, 2004, founder Mark Damon announced that he would resign his post as chairman-CEO of the Media 8 Entertainment studio. After leaving Media 8, on January 23, 2005, Mark Damon would eventually form a new studio Foresight Unlimited, to focus on production, with Media 8 executive Tamara Stuparich De La Barra serving as vice president of production at the studio.

In 2007, Media 8 Entertainment has acquired the Spanish-based film companies Lauren Films and Araba Films, and they now focusing on cinema theater business, until they became dormant in the 2010s.

In April 2012, Media 8 filed for Chapter 11 Bankruptcy, and it was reorganized as Bloom Media following a merger with Capella Films. In August 2017, Bloom was acquired by WME-IMG's Endeavor Content, with Bloom continuing to function as an entity within the company. In October 2018, it was announced that Bloom's operations would be integrated into those of its parent Endeavor Content's, with Bloom's employees being transferred to Endeavor Content.

Films produced by Media 8 

The Ramen Girl (2008)
Man About Town (2006)
Running Scared  (2006)
Santa's Slay (2005)
Havoc (2005)
The Upside of Anger (2005)
Love Wrecked (2005)
Wedding Daze (2004)
Monster (2003)
The I Inside (2003)
11:14 (2003)
The United States of Leland (2003)

MDP Worldwide
FeardotCom (2002)
Extreme Ops (2002)
The Musketeer (2001)
The Body (2001)
Knock Off (1998)
Deceiver (1997)
The Blackout (1997)
The Second Jungle Book: Mowgli & Baloo (1997)
Men of War (1994)
Bad Blood (1994)
Deadly Heroes (1993)

Behaviour Worldwide 

 Love & Sex (2000)
Eye of the Beholder (1999)
Grizzly Falls (1999)

Films distributed by Media 8  
 
The Ramen Girl (2008)
Local Color (2006)
Man About Town (2006) 
Running Scared (2006) 
Santa's Slay (2005) 
Havoc (2005) 
The Upside of Anger (2005) 
Love Wrecked (2005)
Monster (2003)
11:14 (2003)
The I Inside (2003)

MDP Worldwide
Free Money (1998)
The Jungle Book (1994)
Crackerjack (1994)
Bad Blood (1994)
Night Eyes 3 (1993)
Attack of the 50 Ft. Woman (1993)

Behaviour Worldwide 

 Love & Sex (2000)
Eye of the Beholder (1999)
Grizzly Falls (1999)

References

External links
 Archives of this company's former website

Film production companies of the United States
American film studios
American independent film studios